This is a list of cities and towns in the Democratic Republic of the Congo.

Towns and cities

Images

See also
 Former place names in the Democratic Republic of the Congo

References

External links

 
Congo, List of cities in the Democratic Republic of the
Congo, Democratic Republic
Cities
Congo, Democratic Republic